Bartomeu Planells Planells (1949 – 26 March 2021) was a Spanish businessman and politician.

Planells was born into a family of hoteliers. He worked in the wood and furniture industry, serving as President of the Federació de la Petita i Mitjana Empresa d'Eivissa i Formentera from 1981 to 1987.

Planells entered politics in 1976, when he joined the Liberal Party in 1976. He subsequently joined the Union of the Democratic Centre and the People's Alliance, as part of the People's Coalition. He was elected to the Parliament of the Balearic Islands in 1987, the same year when he became Vice-President of the Ibiza and Formentera Insular Council. He served both positions until 1991. While in the Parliament, he chaired the Economic and Finance Committee.

Planells also served as a member of the advisory council of RTVE on behalf of the Balearic Islands. On behalf of the Insular Council, he served on the board of trustees of the National University of Distance Education.

Bartomeu Planells died of cancer in Ibiza on 26 March 2021 at the age of 71.

References

1949 births
2021 deaths
Members of the Parliament of the Balearic Islands
Union of the Democratic Centre (Spain) politicians
People's Alliance (Spain) politicians
People from Ibiza
Deaths from cancer in Spain